= XX de Setiembre =

Coordinates: 32°23′06″S 59°39′53″W

Veinte de Septiembre
- Municipality and village
- Interactive map of Veinte de Septiembre
- Country: Argentina
- Province: Entre Ríos Province
- Time zone: UTC−3 (ART)

XX de Setiembre is a village and municipality in Entre Ríos Province in north-eastern Argentina.
